Long–Allen Bridge can refer to several bridges named in honor of Louisiana Governors Huey P. Long and Oscar K. Allen:

 Long–Allen Bridge (Harrisonburg)
 Long–Allen Bridge (Jonesville)
 Long–Allen Bridge (Morgan City)
 Long–Allen Bridge (Shreveport), bridge across the Red River between Shreveport and Bossier City, better known as the Texas Street Bridge